New Zealand national softball team may refer to:
 New Zealand men's national softball team
 New Zealand women's national softball team